Gu Songfen (born 4 February 1930) is a Chinese aircraft designer. He participated in the design of the Shenyang JJ-1, China's first jet trainer. He was the chief designer of the Shenyang J-8 and J-8II, China's first high-speed, high-altitude interceptor fighter jets. He served as vice president and chief designer of the Shenyang Aircraft Design Institute and is an academician of both the Chinese Academy of Sciences and the Chinese Academy of Engineering.

Early life 

Gu was born 4 February 1930 in Suzhou, Jiangsu, Republic of China. He is the youngest son of Gu Tinglong, a well known sinologist and calligrapher. His given name "Songfen" comes from a passage  of the 3rd-century treatise Wen fu written by Lu Ji.

In 1935, Gu Tinglong accepted a job at the Yenching University library, and moved the family to Beijing. Two years later, the Second Sino-Japanese War broke out and Japanese warplanes bombed the Xiyuan Barracks of the Chinese 29th Army on 28 July 1937. As the Gu family lived near the barracks, their house was shaken by the explosions. Songfen recalled watching the bombs fall out of the planes, before adults urged him to hide under the dining table. He attributes this experience as the main reason he decided to become an aircraft designer.

To escape Japanese occupation, in 1938 Gu Tinglong moved the family to the Shanghai French Concession, where he helped establish the United Library. After the end of the war, Songfen graduated from high school in 1947 and entered National Chiao Tung University, Shanghai to study aeronautical engineering.

Early career: the Shenyang JJ-1 

Gu graduated from university in 1951, and was assigned to work for the newly established Aviation Industry Bureau of the Ministry of Heavy Industry, under China's top aircraft designers Xu Shunshou and Huang Zhiqian. The People's Republic of China (PRC), which had just been founded two years earlier, was still establishing its aviation industry, and in the early years Gu mostly worked on servicing Soviet-made aircraft.

In August 1956, the Aviation Industry Bureau established the PRC's first airplane design office in Shenyang, with Xu Shunshou as its director, Huang Zhiqian and Ye Zhengda as deputy directors. Gu, then 26 years old, was appointed head of the aerodynamics group. The office's first task was to design and build a jet trainer, the Shenyang JJ-1. The plane took its first flight on 26 July 1958, which marked a new era of China's aviation industry.

Chief Designer of the Shenyang J-8 and J-8II 

In October 1964, the Chinese government decided to design and build its first high-speed, high-altitude interceptor fighter jet, later named the Shenyang J-8. Huang Zhiqian was appointed its chief designer, with Gu serving as his deputy. After Huang died in the Pakistan International Airlines Flight 705 crash in 1965, Gu succeeded him as chief designer. The project was delayed by the outbreak of the Cultural Revolution 1966, but the J-8 completed its maiden flight on 5 July 1969, which is considered another milestone in the development of China's aviation industry. In November 1985, the J-8 project won the Special Prize of the State Science and Technology Progress Award, and Gu was named as the first recipient.

By 1977, Gu was chief designer and vice president of the Shenyang Aircraft Design Institute (then called the 601 Institute). In May 1981, Gu was appointed Chief Designer of the Shenyang J-8II, the next generation of the J-8 interceptor. He was assisted by the on-site director Guan De and the chief engineer Gu Yuanjie. The first J-8II plane completed its maiden flight on 12 June 1984, and its design was finalized in 1988. In 2000, the J-8II won the First Prize of the State Science and Technology Progress Award.

Administrative career and honours 
Gu was transferred to Beijing in 1986 to serve as Deputy Director of the national government's Aviation Industry and Technology Commission. In this capacity, he participated in planning the future development of China's aviation industry. In June 2001, Gu, Wang Daheng, Shi Changxu and more than a dozen other scientists proposed the development of China's own jetliner. The proposal was adopted by the Chinese government in 2007, and the Comac C919 took its maiden flight ten years later, on 5 May 2017.

Gu was elected an academician of the Chinese Academy of Sciences in 1991, and of the Chinese Academy of Engineering in 1994. He won the 1995 Ho Leung Ho Lee Prize for Science and Technology Progress. He was elected a delegate to the 7th, 8th, and 9th National People's Congress, and was a member of the Standing Committee of the 9th National People's Congress.

References 

1930 births
Living people
Chinese aircraft designers
Delegates to the 7th National People's Congress
Delegates to the 8th National People's Congress
Delegates to the 9th National People's Congress
Engineers from Jiangsu
Members of the Chinese Academy of Sciences
Members of the Chinese Academy of Engineering
Scientists from Suzhou
National Chiao Tung University (Shanghai) alumni